Eden Brolin (born 1994) is an American actress, best known for her role as Charlie Singer in the Beyond television series and as Mia in Yellowstone. She is the daughter of actor Josh Brolin and Alice Adair.

Career
Brolin's first starring role was in the Richard Linklater-produced indie feature I Dream Too Much. Other credits include Code Black and Manson's Lost Girls.

Brolin stars as the mysterious Charlie Singer in the supernatural drama Beyond on the Freeform TV channel. After a well-reviewed performance in season one, she was quickly promoted to a series regular by the network.

Brolin also stars as Mia opposite Kevin Costner in the western drama Yellowstone, where she plays a barrel racer at the rodeo who becomes friendly with the bunkhouse guys.

She starred as Ophelia in a 2019 stage production of Hamlet.

In 2020, Brolin starred opposite Liam Hemsworth and Vince Vaughn in the Lionsgate theatrical feature Arkansas. 

Brolin is also the lead singer of the music group known as Atta Boy, and eight years after the band's debut album titled Out of Sorts was released, their second album titled Big Heart Manners was released on June 26, 2020.

Personal life
Brolin married Cameron Crosby on May 1, 2022.

Filmography

Film

Television

References

External links 
 

1994 births
Living people
21st-century American actresses
Actresses from Los Angeles
American film actresses
American television actresses
American stage actresses
American voice actresses
American women pop singers